Rebels Without a Clue is the thirteenth studio album by American country music duo The Bellamy Brothers. It was released on September 19, 1988 via MCA and Curb Records. The album includes the singles "Rebels Without a Clue" and "Big Love".

Track listing

Personnel
Adapted from liner notes.

The Bellamy Brothers
David Bellamy - lead & harmony vocals
Howard Bellamy - lead & harmony vocals

Musicians
Pat Flynn - acoustic guitar, mandolin
Lisa Germano - fiddle
John Barlow Jarvis - piano, keyboards
Rick Marotta - drums
Leland Sklar - bass guitar 
Ron Taylor - B-3 organ
Wally Waldimare - harmonica
Billy Joe Walker Jr. - acoustic guitar, electric guitar
Reggie Young - electric guitar

Chart performance

References

1988 albums
The Bellamy Brothers albums
Albums produced by Jimmy Bowen
Albums produced by James Stroud
MCA Records albums
Curb Records albums